Wu Tung-lin (born 12 May 1998) also known as Tony Wu, is a Taiwanese tennis player.

Wu has a career high ATP singles ranking of World No. 163 achieved on 27 February 2023. He also has a career high ATP doubles ranking of World No. 246 achieved on 17 October 2022.

Wu represents Chinese Taipei at the Davis Cup, where he has a W/L record of 1–1.

Career

2022: Maiden Challenger title, top 200 debut
In April 2022, Wu won his first ATP Challenger title in Tallahassee, United States, becoming the fifth Taiwanese player to win an ATP challenger title.

Following his second final at the 2022 Little Rock Challenger in May, he reached the top 200 at World no. 196 on 13 June 2022.

2023: Masters 1000 debut and first win
He made his Masters 1000 debut in Indian Wells as a qualifier and won his first match at this level defeating Kazakhstani Alexander Bublik.

ATP Challengers and ITF Futures/World Tennis Tour finals

Singles: 11 (3–8)

Doubles: 3 (2–1)

References

External links

1998 births
Living people
Taiwanese male tennis players
Sportspeople from Taichung
Universiade medalists in tennis
Universiade bronze medalists for Chinese Taipei
Medalists at the 2019 Summer Universiade
21st-century Taiwanese people